The 1970 Drexel Dragons football team was an American football team that represented Drexel University as an independent during the 1970 NCAA College Division football season. In their second year under head coach Sterling Brown, the team compiled an overall record of 4–4.

Defensive back Lynn Ferguson was awarded third team on the 1970 Little All-America college football team.

Schedule

References

Drexel
Drexel Dragons football seasons
Drexel Dragons football